Palsang Lama is a Nepalese professional footballer who plays as a defender. He last played for Minerva Punjab in the I-League.

Playing career
Born in Nepal, Lama started his football career from United Sikkim FC, Calcutta Football League for the side Tollygunge Agragami. On 13 January 2017 he made his professional debut in the Indian I-League with Minerva Punjab against Aizawl. He started and played 52 minutes as Minerva Punjab lost 1–0.

Honours
Sikkim Himalayan
Sikkim Premier Division League: 2014

References

External links 
 Goal Nepal Profile Profile.

Year of birth missing (living people)
Living people
Sportspeople from Kathmandu
Nepalese footballers
RoundGlass Punjab FC players
Association football defenders
Calcutta Football League players
I-League players
Expatriate footballers in India
Nepalese expatriate footballers
Nepalese expatriate sportspeople in India
Tollygunge Agragami FC players